Louisiana Highway 39 (LA 39) is a state highway in Louisiana that serves Orleans, St. Bernard, and Plaquemines Parishes. In New Orleans, LA 39 is referred to as North Claiborne Avenue, while in St. Bernard Parish, it is known as Judge Perez Drive.  It spans  and is bannered north/south.

Route description
LA 39 begins at Parish Road 15 outside Bohemia and runs parallel with the Mississippi River and LA 23. It passes through Davant, Phoenix, Carlisle, Wills Point, and Woodlawn along the Mississippi River before intersecting with LA 3137 in Scarsdale. The highway then intersects LA 3137 before passing through Caernarvon. It then merges with LA 46 in Poydras. Both LA 39 and LA 46 turn to the north at the intersection with LA 300 before LA 46 splits from LA 39. The highway then runs to the northwest, running parallel with LA 46 through Meraux before intersecting LA 47 in Chalmette. The highway then enters New Orleans and splits into one-way streets. It then reaches its northern terminus at I-10 at exits 236B and 236C.

History

Early Louisiana maps show that the road continued beyond its current southern terminus to Fort St. Philip, yet it is unsure if this road were built and of what quality.  Between Braithewaite and Scarsdale, LA 39 bypassed English Turn, and the original route is now LA 3137. As of 2017, a small portion at the south end is under agreement to be removed from the state highway system and transferred to local control.

Major intersections

References

External links

La DOTD State, District, and Parish Maps
District 02
Plaquemines Parish (Northwest Section)
St. Bernard Parish (West Section)
Orleans Parish

0039
Transportation in Plaquemines Parish, Louisiana
Transportation in St. Bernard Parish, Louisiana
Transportation in New Orleans